1675 Simonida, provisional designation , is a stony Florian asteroid from the inner regions of the asteroid belt, approximately 11 kilometers in diameter. Discovered by Milorad Protić in 1938, it was later named after the medieval Byzantine princess Simonida.

Discovery 

Simonida was discovered on 20 March 1938, by Serbian astronomer Milorad Protić at Belgrade Astronomical Observatory. On the same night, it was independently discovered by Belgian astronomer Fernand Rigaux at Uccle Observatory in Belgium.

Classification and orbit 

The S-type asteroid is a member of the Flora family, a large population of stony asteroids in the main-belt. It orbits the Sun at a distance of 2.0–2.5 AU once every 3 years and 4 months (1,219 days). Its orbit has an eccentricity of 0.12 and an inclination of 7° with respect to the ecliptic. Simonida first observation was a precovery taken at Lowell Observatory in 1931, extending the body's observation arc by 7 years prior to its official discovery observation.

Physical characteristics

Lightcurves 

In March 1988, Polish astronomer Wiesław Z. Wiśniewski obtained a lightcurve of Simonida that gave a rotation period of 5.3 hours with a brightness variation of 0.26 magnitude. In January 2004, astronomer A. Kryszczynska at Poznań Observatory measured a period of 5.2885 hours with an amplitude of 0.50 magnitude. In January 2008, photometric observations by astronomers Martine Castets, Bernard Trégon, Arnaud Leroy and Raoul Behrend gave a rotation period of 5.16 hours with a brightness variation of 0.21.

Diameter and albedo 

According to the space-based Japanese Akari satellite, Simonida measures 12.16 kilometers in diameter, and its surface has an albedo of 0.211. The Collaborative Asteroid Lightcurve Link, however, agrees with the results obtained by 8 observations of the Infrared Astronomical Satellite IRAS, that gave a diameter of 11.08 kilometers and an albedo of 0.25 with an absolute magnitude of 11.9.

Naming 

This minor planet was named for Byzantine princess and queen consort Simonida, the wife of medieval Serbian king Stefan Milutin and symbol of beauty in former Yugoslavia. The official  was published by the Minor Planet Center on 1 January 1973.

References

External links 
 Asteroid Lightcurve Database (LCDB), query form (info )
 Dictionary of Minor Planet Names, Google books
 Asteroids and comets rotation curves, CdR – Observatoire de Genève, Raoul Behrend
 Discovery Circumstances: Numbered Minor Planets (1)-(5000) – Minor Planet Center
 
 

001675
Discoveries by Milorad B. Protić
Named minor planets
19380320